The Buskam, also Buhskam or Buskamen is a large glacial erratic boulder, 325 metres off the coast of Göhren, Rügen, northern Germany. Erratics have been scattered all over northern Germany by the glaciers of the Ice Age, but are usually much smaller. The Buskam has a volume of about 600 m3, a circumference of about 40 metres, and weights about 1,600 tons. A third of it (206 m3) lies above the water surface.

Cavities in the rock indicate that the Buskam was used as a ritual place in prehistory, when such caved rocks were commonly used for ritual sacrifice. An iron crucifix was attached to it after the conversion of Pomerania.

According to local legends, the Buskam is the site where witches dance during Walpurgis Night, and mermaids are also supposed to dance often on the rock.

See also
Glacial erratics on and around Rügen
Early history of Pomerania

References

Ice ages
Pomerania
Glacial erratics of Germany
Natural monuments in Mecklenburg-Western Pomerania
Göhren, Rügen
Walpurgis Night